"Good Bye, So Long" is a song written by Ike Turner. It was originally released by R&B duo Ike & Tina Turner in 1965.

Release 

"Good Bye, So Long" was released as a single on Modern Records in May 1965. It reached No. 31 on Billboard's R&B Singles chart and No. 108 on Bubbling Under The Hot 100. Tina Turner promoted the record on Shindig! in August 1965. The B-side "Hurt Is All You Gave Me" received a 4 star rating from Billboard. Both songs appeared on the compilation album The Soul of Ike & Tina, released on Kent Record in 1966. After the success of "River Deep – Mountain High" overseas, Stateside Records licensed the record and released it as a single in the UK.

A different version of "Good Bye, So Long" later appeared on Ike & Tina Turner's 1970 album Workin' Together. They performed a live version of the song in the 1971 film Taking Off. That year, it was released as a single on BYG Records in France with "It's Crazy Baby" as the B-side track.

Critical reception 
Cash Box (May 22, 1965): "This hard driving rock-R&B number could burn up the charts. Ike and Tina Turner, no strangers to hitsville are already making noise with this one."

Track listing

Chart performance

Cover versions 
 Rock group the Inmates recorded a rendition for their 1989 album Fast forward
 Singer-songwriter Chuck E. Weiss released a version on his 2006 album 23rd and Stout

References 

1965 songs
1965 singles
Ike & Tina Turner songs
Modern Records singles
Songs written by Ike Turner
Song recordings produced by Ike Turner